Beitzel Peak is a peak,  high, rising  southeast of Minaret Peak in the Marble Hills, Heritage Range. It was named by the Advisory Committee on Antarctic Names for John E. Beitzel, a geophysicist on the United States Antarctic Research Program South Pole—Queen Maud Land Traverse I and II, 1964–65 and 1965–66.

The first ascent is credited to British climbers Dominic Spicer and Rob Jarvis in late December 2009.

References 

Mountains of Ellsworth Land